The Las Vegas Classic is an eight-team college basketball tournament held in December at Orleans Arena in Paradise, Nevada. Continental Tire is the current sponsor of the tournament. Each team will play four games in the Classic – the first two at on-campus sites and the final two rounds at the Orleans Arena.

Brackets 
* – Denotes overtime period

2021

2018

2017 
Four schools: Duquesne, Nevada, San Francisco, and Southern Illinois would play in Las Vegas.

The opening round was played December 15, 17 and 19, games were played in Orleans Arena. The format for the 2017 tournament was a showcase format.

Orleans Arena bracket

Visitors Bracket

2016

2015

2014

2013

2012

2011

References

College men's basketball competitions in the United States
College basketball tournaments in Nevada
2011 establishments in Nevada
Basketball competitions in the Las Vegas Valley